Chondracanthus is a red algae genus in the family Gigartinaceae.  The name Chondracanthus is from } ( or chondrus) meaning 'cartilage' and  meaning 'spine or thorn,' together meaning 'with cartilaginous spines.'  This refers to the rubbery papillae on the surface of the blades containing the reproductive structures.

Species
 Chondracanthus acicularis
 Chondracanthus bajacalifornicus
 Chondracanthus canaliculatus
 Chondracanthus chamissoi
 Chondracanthus chapmanii
 Chondracanthus chauvinii
 Chondracanthus corymbiferus
 Chondracanthus elegans
 Chondracanthus exasperatus (Harvey & Bailey) Hughey 1996 - Turkish towel
 Chondracanthus glomeratus
 Chondracanthus harveyanus
 Chondracanthus intermedius
 Chondracanthus johnstonii
 Chondracanthus kjeldsenii
 Chondracanthus saundersii
 Chondracanthus serratus
 Chondracanthus spinosus
 Chondracanthus squarrulosus
 Chondracanthus teedei
 Chondracanthus tenellus
 Chondracanthus tepidus

Phylogeny
A 2008 assessment of the genus showed the following phylogenetic tree:

References

External links
 
 
 Chondracanthus at algaebase.org

Red algae genera
Gigartinaceae
Taxa named by Friedrich Traugott Kützing